Ray Basham, also listed as Bashum, was an American professional baseball catcher in the Negro leagues. He played with the Indianapolis ABCs in 1932.

References

External links
 and Seamheads

Indianapolis ABCs (1931–1933) players
1900 births
Year of death missing
Baseball players from Tennessee
Baseball catchers